Lucille Ball is an outdoor sculpture of the American actress and comedian of the same name, originally sculpted by David Poulin and installed in Lucille Ball Memorial Park in Celoron, New York in 2009. The statue was deemed "scary" by residents, earning it the nickname Scary Lucy. In 2016, the statue was moved nearby and replaced by one created by Carolyn Palmer. The new sculpture is known officially as New Lucy and colloquially as Lovely Lucy.

First statue
In 2009, a statue of Ball was installed in her hometown of Celoron, depicting the climactic scene from the 1952 I Love Lucy episode "Lucy Does a TV Commercial" in which Ball's character, Lucy Ricardo, hawks the alcohol-rich patent medicine Vitameatavegamin while under the effects of heavy dosage of the tonic. Residents noted the statue's deranged, androgynous expression, which bore little resemblance to Ball, earning it the nickname Scary Lucy. The statue garnered little outside attention until 2015, when images of the statue went viral and received international media coverage. The artist discussed fixing the statue with town officials, but claimed they wanted him to do it at his own expense. In 2015, Celoron's mayor said the town was looking to hire a different artist instead.

Second statue
On August 1, 2016, it was announced that a new statue of Ball would replace the original. Carolyn Palmer was unanimously chosen out of a national competition of more than 65 sculptors. She said in a statement, "I not only wanted to portray the playful, animated and spontaneous Lucy, but also the glamorous Hollywood icon" and "I just hope that all the Lucy fans are pleased and that Lucille Ball herself would have enjoyed this image of her." On August 6, 2016, the day that would have been Ball's 105th birthday, the replacement statue was revealed; it depicts Ball standing on a copy of her Hollywood star.

Since Scary Lucy became a local tourist attraction after receiving media attention, it was placed 75 yards from its original location so visitors could visit both statues.

See also
 2009 in art
 2016 in art
 Nathan Bedford Forrest Statue, a statue with a similar reputation

References

External links

2009 establishments in New York (state)
2009 sculptures
2016 establishments in New York (state)
2016 sculptures
Sculpture controversies
Buildings and structures in Chautauqua County, New York
Ball
Ball
Lucille Ball
Monuments and memorials in New York (state)
Outdoor sculptures in New York (state)
Portraits of actors
Sculptures of women in New York (state)
Statues in New York (state)
I Love Lucy